The Elster Mountains is a small range of mountains, in Saxony and the Czech Republic, to the west of the Ore Mountains. They lie in a region known as Vogtland, and take their name from the River Elster, or more precisely the White Elster which has its source in these hills, near the Czech town of Aš.
The valley of the Zwota marks the northeastern border of the Ore Mountains, while to the southwest the valley of the Eger between Selb and Libá separates them from the Fichtelgebirge. 
The highest points  Hoher Brand with an elevation of 805m, Vysoký kámen (Hoher Stein) at 773 m, Háj u Aše (Hainberg) at 758 m and the Kapellenberg at 757 m.
The Elster Mountains have many mineral-rich springs on which the spa towns of Bad Brambach and Bad Elster in Vogtlandkreis were founded; and the Czech spa of Františkovy Lázně (Franzenbad) was founded.

See also 
 List of regions of Saxony

References
This article is sourced from German and Dutch Wikipedia.

Ore Mountains
Natural regions of Saxony
Hill ranges of Germany